Slavcho Penchev Binev (born 10 December 1965 in Sofia), sometimes Slavi Binev, is a Bulgarian politician and former taekwondo champion.

Before politics 
Binev was a taekwondo European champion in 1992.  From the start of the 1990s until 2006, Slavi Binev had been one of the main shareholders in R – System Holding AD. The company included over 100 companies and for many years dictated the modern trends in service, entertainment, construction, investments and security. R – System was ranked 34th by The Bulgarian Chamber of Commerce and Industry in terms of profits for 2003. At that time the American issue Washington Times published an editorial article, entitled “New kids on the Eastern Block”, dedicated to Slavi Binev and his achievements in the business sphere.

Political career 
Slavcho Binev was elected a Member of the European Parliament for the nationalist Attack party on 20 May 2007, immediately after Bulgaria joined the European Union.  Along with Attack's two other MEPs, he sat with the Identity, Tradition, Sovereignty (ITS) group; this group collapsed in November 2007, leaving Attack as non-inscrits members.  He was Attack's candidate for Mayor of Sofia in 2007.  At the 2009 European election, Attack lost one MEP, but Binev retained his seat as the second of two elected for the party.  Binev and Attack remained as non-inscrits members.

On 22 April 2012, he founded his own party: People for Real, Open and United Democracy.  Binev joined the EFD group in the European Parliament in 2012, this information was announced on his website:

Binev is a strong interest in energy policy issues and addresses the plenary session of the European Parliament on energy affordability and the European budget in the October 2013 plenary session.

In January 2009, he initiated a call for European action to address serious in of the Bulgarian energy sector after the accession of the country to the EU.  He opposes the European Commission's proposals to cease production at the "Kozloduy" power plant in the country or over-reliance on energy imports; instead favouring a diverse energy mix.

In March 2013, Binev attended the UK Independence Party's spring conference in the Devonshire city of Exeter, United Kingdom. Addressing delegates, Binev joked that UKIP Deputy leader Paul Nuttall did not have to wear a bullet proof vest on his visit to Sofia and thanked him for his visit on behalf of the EFD. Mr Binev also spoke of the dangers of socialism and dictatorship, whilst explaining the extent of corruption that exists in Bulgaria and emphasising the importance of democracy.

Binev's PROUD was dissolved in August 2013, merging into the NFSB. He joined the Patriotic Front in 2014 and he took part in the 2014 Bulgarian Parliamentary elections, earning a seat from the Haskovo region.

In late November 2014, Binev was appointed as chairman of the Commission for Culture and Media (Bulgarian: Комисия по култура и медии), which led to serious criticism and protests from actors, theatre performers, TV and radio journalists as well as other intellectuals, mainly due to what was regarded by them as his lack of familiarity with and interest in cultural issues and cultural politics. On 8 December 2014, Binev resigned from his position because of the societal discontent. In what was regarded by many as a surprising move due to his previous membership in parties subscribing to Bulgarian nationalism, in 2017 he switched to the MRF.

Personal life 
He was blessed as an archon at Basilica of Saint Mary Major in Rome on 3 January 2007.  This sparked tensions between Bulgaria and the Holy See.  The title had previously been unused in the country, but has been bestowed recently on controversial businessmen that make 'donations which do not contravene Christian morals and good manners'. Binev is married to Maria, with whom he has five children: Martina, Miroslava, Kaloyan, Elena (a member of the Bulgarian national team in rhythmic gymnastics) and Viktoria. Binev is conversant in French, English, Russian, and Italian in addition to his native Bulgarian.

References

External links 

MEPs for Bulgaria 2007–2009
MEPs for Bulgaria 2009–2014
Attack (political party) MEPs
Living people
1965 births
Politicians from Sofia
Bulgarian sportsperson-politicians
Sportspeople from Sofia
Bulgarian male taekwondo practitioners
Bulgarian businesspeople